The Canal de Meaux à Chalifert  is a canal in northern France connecting the Marne River at Meaux to the Marne at Chalifert.  At Lesches there is a  canal tunnel.

See also
 List of canals in France

References

External links
 Project Babel

Meaux
Canals opened in 1846